Soner Aydoğdu (born 5 January 1991) is a Turkish professional footballer who plays as a midfielder for TFF First League club Samsunspor.

Club career
Aydoğdu was born in Mamak, and made his professional debut in 2007 as part of the Gençlerbirliği squad. On 19 June 2012, he signed for Trabzonspor on a five-year contract. He made his debut against Karabükspor on 18 August and provided one assist. On 28 November 2013, he scored his first goal for the club in a UEFA Europa League clash against Apollon Limassol, helping the team to win 4-2.

On 10 May 2018, Aydoğdu helped Akhisar Belediyespor win their first professional trophy, the 2017–18 Turkish Cup.

On 11 June 2019, he signed a three-year contract with İstanbul Başakşehir.

On 27 August 2019, he joined Göztepe on a one-year loan.

Aydoğdu joined Antalyaspor on 9 June 2022, signing a two-year contract with an option for an additional year.

On 26 January 2023, Aydoğdu moved to Samsunspor on a 2.5-year contract.

Career statistics

International career
Aydoğdu earned his Turkish national football team debut in 2012.

Honours
Akhisarspor
 Turkish Cup: 2017-18

References

External links

 
 
 
 

1991 births
Living people
People from Mamak, Ankara
Turkish footballers
Turkey international footballers
Turkey B international footballers
Turkey under-21 international footballers
Turkey youth international footballers
Association football midfielders
Gençlerbirliği S.K. footballers
Hacettepe S.K. footballers
Trabzonspor footballers
Akhisarspor footballers
İstanbul Başakşehir F.K. players
Göztepe S.K. footballers
Antalyaspor footballers
Samsunspor footballers
Süper Lig players
TFF First League players